Grünow is a municipality in the Mecklenburgische Seenplatte district, in Mecklenburg-Vorpommern, Germany.

See also
Grunow (disambiguation)

References

Grand Duchy of Mecklenburg-Strelitz